"Rome wasn't built in a day" is an adage attesting to the need for time to create great things.  It is the usual English translation of a medieval French phrase, from the collection , published around 1190. The modern French form is «».

The expression, (as "Rome was not built in one day") is given in English in John Heywood's A Dialogue Conteinyng the Nomber in Effect of all the Prouerbes in the Englishe Tongue (c. 1538), while Queen Elizabeth I referred to the idea in Latin in an address at Cambridge in 1563. The present perfect and oratio recta version of the Latin saying—the version one would use for a stand-alone quotation—would be Roma uno die non est condita.

The phrase was used in the title of a 1964 song Sam Cooke also covered by British singer Anne Shelton in 1962.

References

Adages
Antiquity in popular culture
Metaphors referring to places